The Kaiser-Franz-Josefs-Höhe (often just Franz-Josefs-Höhe) is part of the Grossglockner High Alpine Road. The Kaiser-Franz-Josefs-Höhe can only be reached by vehicle via the Grossglockner High Alpine Road, which is subject to a toll, from both Salzburg and Carinthia.

References 

Glockner Group
Buildings and structures in Carinthia (state)
Squares in Austria
Mountain huts in Austria
Transport buildings and structures in Austria